George Winter may refer to:
George Winter (artist) (1810–1876), English-born painter of American frontier life
George Winter (Australian politician) (1815–1879), pastoralist and member of the Victorian Legislative Council
George Winter (baseball) (1878–1951), a.k.a. "Sassafras", Major League Baseball player
George D. Winter (1927–1981), British doctor and medical pioneer
George Winter (footballer) (1908–1972), Australian rules footballer

See also
George Wintour, grandson of Robert Wintour, see Wintour baronets